The Arrows A18 was the car with which the Arrows Formula One team competed in the 1997 Formula One season.  It was driven by Damon Hill, the reigning Champion who had made the surprising move to the team after being dropped from Williams, and Pedro Diniz, who had moved from Ligier.

The A18 was launched in January 1997.  marked a new beginning for the team, with two new drivers, a new engine supplier in Yamaha with the engines tuned by John Judd and new tyres supplied by Bridgestone, supplied under an exclusive deal. The team moved from old premises in Milton Keynes to TWR's purpose-built factory in Leafield. The year also marked the first full season for Tom Walkinshaw's outfit TWR in running the team, as the Scotsman had bought it from one of its founders, Jackie Oliver during .

After a disastrous start to the season which saw the cars almost fail to make the grid in Australia, the team improved, hiring John Barnard as Technical Director. The A18 was proven to be woefully unreliable, despite Walkinshaw's claims that he had wanted a simple and basic chassis design. Damon Hill stated in his autobiography that the car was good to drive but lacked downforce. Hill scored a point at Silverstone, but the highlight of the year came at the Hungarian GP, where he qualified third and led for most of the race. The failure of a throttle linkage component saw him drop behind Jacques Villeneuve on the final lap, although second place was still a great success for the team.  Diniz also scored two points at the Nürburgring.

The team eventually finished eighth in the Constructors' Championship, with nine points.

Complete Formula One results
(key) (results in bold indicate pole position)

References

AUTOCOURSE 1997-98, Henry, Alan (ed.), Hazleton Publishing Ltd. (1997) 

A18
1997 Formula One season cars